The Music Awards Ceremony (often simply called the MAC) are annual popular music awards for Serbia, Croatia, Bosnia and Herzegovina, Slovenia, North Macedonia and Montenegro presented by Skymedia Group. The awards were first held on 29 January 2019 at the Belgrade Arena. The MAC is broadcast on several regional television networks, as well as via YouTube. It consists of up to 20 different categories, which are based on public votes, and other special awards, whose winners are determined by the organizers. MAC is recognized as  one of the highest profile music awards ceremony in the western Balkans.

Music Awards Ceremony has received international critical acclaim. In August 2022, it was also declared the manifestations of special importance for the City of Belgrade.

Ceremonies

Categories

Current
The 2023 MAC announced the following seventeen award categories based on the public vote.

 Male Pop Song of the Year (2019-present)
 Female Pop Song of the Year (2019-present)
 Alternative Pop Song Year (2019-present)
 Pop-Folk Song of the Year (2020-present)
 Folk Song of the Year (2019-present)
 World Music Song of the Year (2019-present)
 Rock Song of the Year (2019-present)
 Rap/Hip Hop Song of the Year (2019-present)
 Collaboration of the Year (2020-present)
 Male Trap Song of the Year (2023-present)
 Female Trap Song of the Year (2023-present)
 Balkan Trap Song of the Year (2023-present)
 Urban Pop Song of the Year (2023-present)
 Drill Song of the Year (2023-present)
 New Age Collaboration of the Year (2020-present)
 Concert of the Year (2019-present)
 Music Festival of the Year (2023-present)
 Album of the Year (2023-present)
 Music Video of the Year (2019-present)
 Viral Song of the Year (2023-present)

Defunct

 Band Pop Song of the Year (2019-2020)
 Pop Collaboration of the Year (2020)
 Pop-Rock Song of the Year (2020)
 Modern Dance Song of the Year (2019)
 Breakthrough Artist (2019-2020)
 Cover Song of the Year (2020)
 YouTube Star of the Year (2020)

Special awards
 Artist of the year
 Contribution to Music
 Career Achievement
 Golden MAC for Authenticity; given to acts for their "outstanding uniqueness"
 Master of Ceremony; given to new age and contemporary artist for their "remarkable success"

Most successful acts

Performances

Broadcasts

References

Music festivals in Serbia
Music festivals established in 2019